The 2021–22 season was the 98th season in the existence of Sint-Truidense V.V. and the club's seventh consecutive season in the top flight of Belgian football. In addition to the domestic league, Sint-Truidense V.V. participated in this season's edition of the Belgian Cup.

Players

First-team squad

On loan

Transfers

Pre-season and friendlies

Competitions

Overall record

First Division A

League table

Results summary

Results by round

Matches
The league fixtures were announced on 8 June 2021.

Belgian Cup

References

Sint-Truidense V.V.
Sint-Truiden